The Presbyterian Church in Korea (JeongRip) was founded in 1964 by Pastor Lee Eun-Kyu, and Kim Guk-In and Choi Soo-Haeng. The former denomination was the Presbyterian Church in Korea (BoSu). They opened the DongWon Seminary without permission of the government, later the Seminary was closed, and many members left the denominations. To begin a new start Kim Guk-In and Chung Kyu-Wan formed this church. The Westminster Confession and the Apostles Creed are officially accepted. It has 17,000 members and 310 congregations in 2004.

References 

Presbyterian denominations in Asia
Presbyterian denominations in South Korea